Youssouf Hiss Bachir (born 1 January 1987) is a Djiboutian middle-distance runner. He represented his country at two indoor and one outdoor World Championships.

Competition record

1Did not finish in the final

Personal bests
Outdoor
1500 metres – 3:36.96 (Ninove 2015)
3000 metres – 7:50.96 (Karlstad 2013)
5000 metres – 13:28.20 (Ninove 2013)
Half marathon – 1:05:45 (Nanning 2010)
Indoor
1500 metres – 3:40.61 (Sabadell 2016)
3000 metres – 7:43.44 (Stockholm 2016)

References

External links
 

1987 births
Living people
Djiboutian male middle-distance runners
Djiboutian male long-distance runners
Place of birth missing (living people)
World Athletics Championships athletes for Djibouti
Athletes (track and field) at the 2015 African Games
Athletes (track and field) at the 2019 African Games
African Games competitors for Djibouti